Saint-Witz is a commune in the Val-d'Oise department in Île-de-France in northern France.

Geography

Climate

Saint-Witz has a oceanic climate (Köppen climate classification Cfb).

Education
Public secondary schools:
 Collège Françoise Dolto, a public junior high school serving Saint-Witz, is in Marly-la-Ville.
 Saint-Witz has one public senior high school: Lycée Léonard de Vinci.

Collège Institut Paul Ricoeur/Lycée Institut Paul RICOEUR is in nearby Louvres.

Institut Saint-Dominique, a private Catholic preschool through senior high, is in nearby Mortefontaine, Oise.

See also
Communes of the Val-d'Oise department

References

External links

Home page 
Association of Mayors of the Val d'Oise 

Communes of Val-d'Oise